A Baixa Limia, in Spanish Baja Limia, is a comarca in the Galician Province of Ourense. The overall population of this  local region is 9,245 (2005).

Municipalities
Bande, Entrimo, Lobeira, Lobios and Muíños.

References 

A Baixa Limia